Sigala is a village in Hiiumaa Parish, Hiiu County in northwestern Estonia. 

The word sigala means piggery in Estonian, but this is coincidence: there was never a piggery in village.

References

Villages in Hiiu County